Feodosiy Yuryevich Efremenkov (born 19 March 1996) is a Russian former competitive figure skater. He was born in Klin, and is the 2012 Winter Youth Olympics bronze medalist.

Programs

Competitive highlights 
JGP: Junior Grand Prix

References

External links 

 

1996 births
Living people
People from Klin
Russian male single skaters
Figure skaters at the 2012 Winter Youth Olympics
Sportspeople from Moscow Oblast
20th-century Russian people
21st-century Russian people